The 2021 FIVB Volleyball Men's U21 World Championship was the 21st edition of the FIVB Volleyball Men's U21 World Championship, contested by the men's national teams under the age of 21 of the members of the FIVB, the sport's global governing body. The tournament was held in Italy and Bulgaria from 23 September to 3 October 2021. For the first time, the tournament was jointly hosted by more than one country.

Iran were the defending champions, having won their first title in Bahrain.

Players must have been born on or after 1 January 2001.

Qualification
A total of 16 teams qualified for the final tournament. In addition to Italy and Bulgaria who qualified automatically as hosts, another 10 teams qualified via five separate continental tournaments while the remaining 4 teams qualified via the FIVB U21 World Ranking. But, South Korea and China later withdrew and were replaced by Thailand and Poland respectively. In addition, Cameroon withdrew just before the beginning of the tournament. All of Cameroon's matches were forfeited and Cameroon were ranked in last place in the final standing.

1.On 14 December 2020, AVC announced that the 2020 Asian Championship which was originally the AVC qualifier for the tournament was canceled due to COVID-19 pandemic and the top two teams of the 2018 Asian Championship qualified as the AVC representatives.
2.On 30 November 2020, NORCECA announced that the 2020 NORCECA Championship which was originally the NORCECA qualifier for the tournament was canceled due to COVID-19 pandemic and the top two teams of the NORCECA Ranking as of January 2020 qualified as the NORCECA representatives.
3.2020 South American Championship which was originally the CSV qualifier for the tournament was canceled due to COVID-19 pandemic and the top two CSV teams of the World Ranking as of 1 March 2021 qualified as the CSV representatives.
4.With European runners-up Italy hosting the tournament together with Bulgaria, European 3rd place Belgium joined the field for the tournament as well.

Pools composition

First round
Teams were seeded in the first two positions of each pool following the serpentine system according to their FIVB U21 World Ranking as of 1 March 2021. FIVB reserved the right to seed the hosts as head of pools A and B regardless of the U21 World Ranking. All teams not seeded were drawn to take other available positions in the remaining lines, following the U21 World Ranking. The draw was held on 15 June 2021. Rankings are shown in brackets except the hosts Italy and Bulgaria who ranked 1st and 27th respectively.

Draw

Second round

Squads

Venues

Pool standing procedure
 Number of matches won
 Match points
 Sets ratio
 Points ratio
 If the tie continues as per the point ratio between two teams, the priority will be given to the team which won the last match between them. When the tie in points ratio is between three or more teams, a new classification of these teams in the terms of points 1, 2 and 3 will be made taking into consideration only the matches in which they were opposed to each other.

Match won 3–0 or 3–1: 3 match points for the winner, 0 match points for the loser
Match won 3–2: 2 match points for the winner, 1 match point for the loser

First round

Pool A
All times are Central European Summer Time (UTC+02:00).

|}

|}

Pool B
All times are Eastern European Summer Time (UTC+03:00).

|}

|}

Pool C
All times are Central European Summer Time (UTC+02:00).

|}

|}

Pool D
All times are Eastern European Summer Time (UTC+03:00).
Cameroon's forfeited matches (25–0, 25–0, 25–0) were not recorded and excluded from the ranking calculation.

|}

|}

Second round

Pool E
All times are Central European Summer Time (UTC+02:00).

|}

|}

Pool F
All times are Eastern European Summer Time (UTC+03:00).

|}

|}

Pool G
All times are Central European Summer Time (UTC+02:00).

|}

|}

Pool H
All times are Eastern European Summer Time (UTC+03:00).
Cameroon's forfeited matches (25–0, 25–0, 25–0) were not recorded and excluded from the ranking calculation.

|}

|}

Final round

13th–16th places
All times are Eastern European Summer Time (UTC+03:00).
Cameroon's forfeited matches (25–0, 25–0, 25–0) were not recorded.

13th–16th semifinals

|}

13th place match

|}

9th–12th places
All times are Eastern European Summer Time (UTC+03:00).

9th–12th semifinals

|}

11th place match

|}

9th place match

|}

5th–8th places
All times are Central European Summer Time (UTC+02:00).

5th–8th semifinals

|}

7th place match

|}

5th place match

|}

Final four
All times are Central European Summer Time (UTC+02:00).

Semifinals

|}

3rd place match

|}

Final

|}

Final standing

Awards

Most Valuable Player
 Alessandro Michieletto
Best Setter
 Paolo Porro 
Best Outside Spikers
 Manuel Armoa  
 Tommaso Rinaldi   

Best Middle Blockers
 Karol Urbanowicz   
 Nicola Ciancotta    
Best Opposite Spiker
 Roman Murashko    
Best Libero
 Damiano Catania

See also
2021 FIVB Volleyball Women's U20 World Championship

References

External links

FIVB Volleyball Men's U21 World Championship
FIVB U21 World Championship
FIVB
FIVB
FIVB
FIVB
FIVB